Last Words is a 2020 internationally co-produced drama film directed by Jonathan Nossiter. It was selected to be shown at the 2020 Cannes Film Festival. It premiered at the Deauville American Film Festival on 6 September 2020.

Cast
 Nick Nolte as Shakespeare
 Kalipha Touray as Kal
 Charlotte Rampling as Batlk
 Alba Rohrwacher as Dima
 Stellan Skarsgård as Zyberski
 Maryam d'Abo 
 Silvia Calderoni as Anna

References

External links
 

2020 films
2020 drama films
American drama films
French drama films
Italian drama films
English-language French films
English-language Italian films
Films directed by Jonathan Nossiter
2020s English-language films
2020s American films
2020s French films